George Hairston Jamerson (November 8, 1869 - August 31, 1960) was an American brigadier general during World War I.

Early life and education 
George Hairston Jamerson was born on November 8, 1869, in Martinsville, Virginia.

Jamerson attended the Ruffner Institute in Martinsville, Virginia, and Virginia A and M College in Blacksburg, Virginia.  He graduated from the United States Military Academy in the class of 1893.

Career 

During World War I, Jamerson commanded the 159th Infantry Brigade of the 80th Infantry Division.

Awards
He received the Distinguished Service Medal. The citation for the medal reads:

His other awards include the Silver Star, Victory medal with 4 clasps, Army of Cuban Occupation Medal, Philippine Campaign Medal, and the Mexican Border Service Medal.

Personal life 
Jamerson married Elsie T. Barbour on October 20, 1897.  Together, they had one son: Osmund T. Jamerson.

Death and legacy 
Jamerson died on August 31, 1960.

References 

United States Army generals
United States Military Academy alumni
People from Martinsville, Virginia
1869 births
1960 deaths
United States Army generals of World War I
Military personnel from Virginia
Recipients of the Distinguished Service Medal (US Army)